Alyona Viktorovna Vylegzhanina (Алёна Викторовна Вылегжанина, born 14 August 1987) is a Russian water polo player. She was a member of the Russia women's national water polo team, playing as a centre back. She was a part of the team at the 2008 Summer Olympics. On club level she played for Uralochka Zlatoust in Russia.

See also
 List of World Aquatics Championships medalists in water polo

References

External links
 

1987 births
Living people
Russian female water polo players
Water polo players at the 2008 Summer Olympics
Olympic water polo players of Russia
People from Zlatoust
Universiade medalists in water polo
Universiade bronze medalists for Russia
Medalists at the 2011 Summer Universiade
Sportspeople from Chelyabinsk Oblast
21st-century Russian women